Eila Susanne Nilsson (born 20 November 1966 in Norsjö, died 19 September 2022 in Skelleftehamn, Skellefteå kommun) was a Swedish swimmer, masseur, therapist in Chinese medicine and lecturer in mental counseling.

Biography 
Nilsson was born in Norsjö and was diagnosed with diabetes at the age of three. At the age of 21, in 1987, she suffered changes in her right eye. These were treated with lasers, but she became blind on her right eye. The left eye suffered from bleeding a few months later. After four specialist operations, the retina detached and she lost the sight in that eye as well. In 2017, Nilsson suffered from malignant breast cancer, which was followed by chemotherapy and radiation.

Nilsson died at the age of 55.

Merits
As a swimmer, Nilsson became a double Paralympic champion in swimming for the blind, which she won at the Paralympic Games in Atlanta 1996. She also won two European Championship golds and several Swedish championships. As of 2022, she still held the world record in 50 meter freestyle for the blind at 33.02 seconds.

Sources

1966 births
2022 deaths
Paralympic swimmers of Sweden
People from Skellefteå Municipality
Swedish female backstroke swimmers
Swedish female freestyle swimmers
Sportspeople with a vision impairment
Swimmers at the 1996 Summer Paralympics
Medalists at the 1996 Summer Paralympics
Paralympic gold medalists for Sweden
People with diabetes
Deaths from breast cancer
Deaths from cancer in Sweden